Let Me Tell You 'Bout It is the debut album by American jazz saxophonist Leo Parker featuring performances recorded and released by the Blue Note label in 1961. The CD reissue features two bonus tracks from the same session.

Reception

The Allmusic review by Scott Yanow awarded the album 4 stars and stated "Parker (who is joined by obscure sidemen) sounds in top form during his varied program which includes several hard swingers".

Track listing
All compositions by Leo Parker except as indicated

 "Glad Lad" - 5:17
 "Blue Leo" (Parker, Ike Quebec) - 5:06
 "Let Me Tell You 'Bout It" (Robert Lewis) - 4:18
 "Vi" (Lewis) - 4:41
 "Parker's Pals" - 6:21
 "Low Brown" (Yusef Salim) - 5:49
 "TCTB" (Parker, Swindell) - 6:26
 "The Lion's Roar" (Russell Jacquet, Parker) - 4:26 Bonus track on CD reissue
 "Low Brown" [Long Version] - 8:24 Bonus track on CD reissue

Personnel
Leo Parker - baritone saxophone
John Burks - trumpet
Bill Swindell - tenor saxophone
Yusef Salim - piano
Stan Conover - bass
Purnell Rice – drums

References

1961 debut albums
Albums produced by Alfred Lion
Albums recorded at Van Gelder Studio
Blue Note Records albums
Leo Parker albums